"You're Gonna Love Again" is a song by Australian twin sisters Nervo featuring uncredited songwriting and producing from Swedish DJ Avicii.  The single was released digitally on 4 June 2012 in Australia and the United States and is included on their 2015 album, Collateral.

"You're Gonna Love Again" was leaked in 2011 and reached the #1 position on the Hype Machine chart.

Review
In an Amazon review, the editor said; "The song is a marked departure in style and sound from their more underground dance floor productions of the past year, and showcases a daring new vision, that sets its sights on the future of pop, electro-based and dance-edged."

Music video
A music video to accompany the release of "You're Gonna Love Again" was first released onto YouTube on 2 July 2012 at a total length of three minutes and forty-four seconds. It features Australian actress Cleopatra Coleman.

Track listing

Chart performance

Release history

References

2012 singles
2011 songs
Nervo (DJs) songs
Astralwerks singles
Song recordings produced by Nervo (DJs)
Songs written by Avicii
Songs written by Miriam Nervo
Songs written by Olivia Nervo